Liebestraum means "love dream", or "dream of love" in German.

 Liebesträume, for piano by Franz Liszt
 Liebestraum (film), 1991 movie by Mike Figgis